Olivier Doleuze (born 19 April 1972) is a French born jockey and is considered to be one of the world's premier jockeys. Doleuze began riding at the age of 14 and finished his career with more than 1,400 wins, 571 of those in Hong Kong.
In 2010/11 he rode 38 winners, bringing his Hong Kong career total to 375.

Major wins

France
 Critérium de Saint-Cloud - (1) - Special Quest (1997)
 Grand Critérium - (1) - Okawango (2000)
 Poule d'Essai des Poulains - (1) - Green Tune (1994)
 Prix de l'Abbaye de Longchamp - (1) - Kistena (1996)
 Prix du Cadran - (1) - Chief Contender (1997)
 Prix de Diane - (1) - Egyptband (2000)
 Prix de la Forêt - (2) - Occupandiste (1997), Dedication (2002)
 Prix d'Ispahan - (1) - Green Tune (1995)
 Prix Jean Prat - (1) - Rouvres (2002)
 Prix Marcel Boussac - (2) - Loving Claim (1997), Juvenia (1998)
 Prix Maurice de Gheest - (1) - Occupandiste (1997)

Hong Kong
 Hong Kong Mile - (3) - The Duke (2006), Good Ba Ba (2007, 2009)
 Champions Mile - (1) - Good Ba Ba (2008)
 Chairman's Sprint Prize - (1) - Dim Sum (2011)
 Hong Kong Classic Cup - (1) - Zaidan (2012)
 Centenary Sprint Cup - (3) - Eagle Regiment (2012, 2013), D B Pin (2018)
 Jockey Club Mile - (1) - Gold-Fun (2013)
 Sha Tin Trophy - (1) - Gold-Fun (2013)
 National Day Cup - (1) - Gold-Fun (2013)

Singapore
 KrisFlyer International Sprint - (1) - Iron Mask (2001)
 Singapore Airlines International Cup - (1) - Chinchon (2012)

UAE
 Al Shindagha Sprint - (1) - Dynamic Blitz (2011)
 Mahab Al Shimaal - (1) - Rich Tapestry (2014)

United States
 Santa Anita Sprint Championship - (1) - Rich Tapestry (2014)

Performance

Notes

References
 NTRA profile
The Hong Kong Jockey Club

French jockeys
1972 births
Living people
Hong Kong jockeys